Schoenocephalium is a group of plants in the family Rapateaceae described as a genus in 1845.

The genus is native to South America.

 Species
 Schoenocephalium cucullatum Maguire - S Venezuela, SE Colombia, NW Brazil
 Schoenocephalium martianum Seub. - Colombia (Amazonas)
 Schoenocephalium schultesii Maguire - Colombia (Vaupés)
 Schoenocephalium teretifolium Maguire - SE Colombia to Venezuela (Amazonas)

References

Poales genera
Rapateaceae